Crying Time is a studio album by Ray Charles released in February 1966 as the first release on his label Tangerine, which was distributed by ABC Paramount.

Track listing 
LP side A
 "Crying Time" (Buck Owens) – 2:57
 "No Use Crying" (Roy Gaines, Freddie Lee Kober, J.B. Daniels) – 3:17
 "Let's Go Get Stoned" (Valerie Simpson, Nickolas Ashford, Jo Armstead) – 3:00
 "Going Down Slow" (Jimmy Oden) – 4:03
 "Peace of Mind" (Ray Charles, J. Holiday) – 2:14
 "Tears" (Norman Newell, Robert Maxwell) – 4:38
LP side B
 "Drifting Blues" (Johnny Moore, Eddie Williams, Charles Brown) – 6:24
 "We Don't See Eye to Eye" (Percy Mayfield) – 2:21
 "You're In For a Big Surprise" (Percy Mayfield) – 3:35
 "You're Just About to Lose Your Clown" (Johnny MacRae) – 2:01
 "Don't You Think I Ought To Know" (William Johnson, Melvin Wettergreen) – 3:05
 "You've Got a Problem" (William D. Weeks, Freddy James) – 3:28

Personnel 
 Ray Charles – piano, vocals
Billy Preston – electric organ on "No Use Crying", "Let's Go Get Stoned"
 Joe Adams – producer
 William Alexander – album cover artist
 George S. Whiteman – album cover design
 Joe Lebow – liner notes
 The Raelettes – performer
 Onzy Matthews - arranger

Charting history

See also
List of number-one R&B albums of 1966 (U.S.)

References 

 ABC Paramount (Tangerine) ABC 544 (1966 LP)

External links 
 

Ray Charles albums
1966 albums
Concord Records albums
ABC Records albums
Tangerine Records (1962) albums